Submerging a mobile phone or smartphone which has suffered from water damage into rice has not been shown to be effective in repairing them. Although submerging these devices into a desiccant may or may not be more effective than leaving them to dry in open air, uncooked rice is inferior to other common desiccants such as silica gel or cat litter. Nevertheless, it is still recommended because a side effect of the process is that users will not use their phone for a longer period compared to not drying it in rice, which increases the chance of having a working phone afterwards.

History 
Rice has traditionally been used to keep camera equipment and films dry in tropical environments.

The trick has been documented to be used on phones since 2000, when someone used it to repair a Nokia 5130. In July 2007, less than a month after the original iPhone was released, a member of MacRumors named jorsuss started a thread titled "I dropped my iPhone in water". They covered the phone in rice, which may have been the first documented attempt to use the procedure on an iPhone.

See also 
 IP Code

References 

Smartphones
Misconceptions